The Malaysia–Philippines border is a maritime boundary located in the South China, Sulu and Celebes Seas. It separates the Malaysian state of Sabah, which is on the island of Borneo, and the Sulu Islands of the southern Philippines.

The boundary is the result of the division of the Sulu Sultanate through the cession of its territories to colonial powers. The British gained control of the northeast shores of Borneo, which became known as North Borneo and subsequently Sabah, while the rest of the Sulu Islands fell under Spanish control and later United States rule. The Philippines still officially claim the eastern part of Sabah as part of its territory, arguing the validity of the cession by the heirs of the Sultan of Sulu.

Malaysia and the Philippines are also parties to the multinational claims over the Spratly Islands and both countries have overlapping claims over some islands of the archipelago.

The historical connections of the people living on both sides of the border has resulted in the border being extremely porous, with a lot of illegal immigration from the Philippines to Malaysia occurring. The porous border has also resulted in several incidents of cross-border raids and kidnapping by armed groups from the Philippines on Malaysian towns and resorts on the east coast of Sabah.

The border and disputes
The Malaysian–Philippine border consists of two segments. The first segment is the portion that has already been delimited through treaty. The second maritime segment has yet to be delimited because it is in the Spratly Islands area in the South China Sea where the two countries have overlapping claims over the continental shelf and islands.

Treaty defined border
Three treaties defined the territorial extent of the Philippine archipelago, of which two are relevant in terms of determining the boundary between Malaysia and the Philippines. The third treaty concerns the cession of some islands in the Sulu Sea but does not include any boundary determination clauses.

The Treaty of Paris of 1898 between Spain and the United States defined the territorial waters of the Philippines. Only one portion of the boundary delimited by this treaty is relevant to the common border between the two countries. The relevant stretch lies between the Philippine island of Palawan and the northern tip of the Malaysian state of Sabah between turning points 7° 40' N 116° 0' E and 7° 40' N 117° 0' E. Although the British were not parties to this treaty, it has never challenged the extent of Philippine territorial waters after occupying North Borneo (Sabah today). Malaysia too has not challenged the boundary and had in fact recognised it via its 1979 map which follows this portion of the boundary as the extent of its territorial waters.

The second treaty is the Convention regarding the Boundary between the Philippine Archipelago and the State of North Borneo between the United States and the United Kingdom which was signed at Washington, D.C. on 2 January 1930. The treaty subsequently came into force with the Exchange of Notes on 6 July 1932. The United States was the sovereign ruler of the Philippines at that time after acquiring it from Spain under the 1898 treaty between the US and Spain while the UK was the colonial ruler of North Borneo. The modern states of the Philippines and Malaysia became the successor states of the said treaties. Article I of this treaty establishes the turning points for the defined portion of the maritime border between Malaysia and the Philippines. The convention amended portions of the limits defined by the 1898 treaty to the current alignment of the Malaysia–Philippines border in the Sulu Sea, between point 7° 40' N 117° 0' E and 4° 45' N 120° 0' E.

No common tri-point for Indonesia, Malaysia and the Philippines in the Celebes Sea was established as this treaty did not involve the Netherlands, being the colonial ruler of what is today Indonesia, as a signatory. The three countries have also not negotiated for a common tri-point after their independence. In fact, Indonesia and Malaysia are currently involved in a dispute resulting from overlapping claims of the continental shelf in the Celebes Sea and negotiations to establish the tripoint seem unlikely for the near future.

Disputed boundary
Both Malaysia and the Philippines also have overlapping claims over the continental shelf and islands in the Spratly Islands area of the South China Sea. China/Taiwan and Vietnam also claim the entire Spratly Islands area as part of their territory and territorial waters while a small portion of the area of overlapping claim by Malaysia and the Philippines is also claimed by Brunei.

Malaysian claim
Malaysia bases its claim on the United Nations Convention on the Law of the Sea's  rule. In 1979, it published a territorial sea and continental shelf map depicting its claim over the area.

The Philippines claim results in the boundary claimed by Malaysia above being disputed from midway between Point 53 and Point 54 onwards until Point 66 which is the western starting point of the treaty defined, and thus agreed to, boundary between the two countries.

Philippines claim
The Philippines' claim in the Spratly Islands area, known as the Kalayaan Islands, is based on discovery and geographical continuity. The territorial waters of the claim was declared by President Ferdinand Marcos in Presidential Decree 1596 on 11 June 1978. The claim was further reinforced in the Philippines Archipelagic Baselines Act (Republic Act No. 9522) signed by President Gloria Macapagal-Arroyo on 11 March 2009.

See also
Indonesia–Philippines border
Malaysia–Philippines relations
Spratly Islands

References

 
Borders of Malaysia
Malaysia